FICA is the Federal Insurance Contributions Act.

FICA may also refer to :
 Federation of International Cricketers' Associations
 Folded Inverted Conformal Antenna
 Foreign Interference (Countermeasures) Act, a law in Singapore dealing with foreign interference
 Football Inter Club Association, a Haitian association football club
 Forum for International Conciliation and Arbitration
 Fundacao International de Capoeira de Angola or International Capoeira Angola Foundation

People with the surname
 Fernando Fica, Chilean footballer

See also
 FICO